Vidheyan is a 1994 Indian Malayalam-language drama film directed and written by Adoor Gopalakrishnan. It is based on the novella Bhaskara Pattelarum Ente Jeevithavum by Paul Zacharia. The film, starring Mammootty and M. R. Gopakumar, explores the master-slave relationship in a South Karnataka setting.

Vidheyan won the National Film Award for Best Feature Film in Malayalam and Best Actor Award for Mammootty. It also won numerous awards at the Kerala State Film Awards, including the Best Film.

Plot 
Thommy, a Christian migrant labourer from Kerala is an obedient slave of his aggressive, tyrannical landlord Bhaskara Pattelar. Thommy obeys all the orders of his master, whether it is to make his own wife sexually available to his master or in killing Pattelar's kindly wife, Saroja. When Pattelar escapes to a jungle, due to his own deeds, Thommy escorts him like a pet. But when Pattelar is killed Thommy exults in freedom.

Cast

Production 
The film is a cinematic adaptation of the novel Bhaskara Pattelarum Ente Jeevithavum by Malayalam writer Paul Zacharia. Zacharia's novella was inspired by a real-life character named Patela Shekhara Gowda alias Shiradi Shekhara. Zacharia happened to hear the stories of Patelar when he was residing near Shiradi village Mangalore in Karnataka. After the release of the film, Adoor had a tiff with Zacharia over the film. Zachariah said Adoor tainted his story with Hindutva.

Accolades 
1993 National Film Awards

 Kerala State Film Awards

 Other awards

References

External links 
 

1990s Malayalam-language films
1993 films
Best Malayalam Feature Film National Film Award winners
Films about Indian slavery
Films based on Indian novels
Films directed by Adoor Gopalakrishnan
Films featuring a Best Actor National Award-winning performance
Films scored by Vijaya Bhaskar
Films shot in Karnataka
Films shot in Mangalore
Indian drama films